The Upper Cross River languages form a branch of the Cross River languages of Cross River State, Nigeria. The most populous languages are Loko and Mbembe, with 100,000 speakers.

Languages
The internal structure per Cornell (1994), reproduced in Williamson and Blench (2000), is as follows:

Names and locations
Below is a list of language names, populations, and locations from Blench (2019).

Reconstruction
A reconstruction of Proto-Upper Cross River has been proposed by Gerrit Dimmendaal (1978).

See also
List of Proto-Upper Cross River reconstructions (Wiktionary)

References

External links
ComparaLex, database with Upper Cross River word lists

 
Cross River languages